Donald "Don" Hatfield (6 November 1924 – 1981) was an English professional rugby league footballer who played in the 1940s, 1950s and 1960s. He played at club level for Halifax (Heritage № 568), Dewsbury and  Hunslet (Heritage №), as a  i.e. number 8 or 10, during the era of contested scrums.

Background

Playing career

Championship final appearance
Donald Hatfield played left-, i.e. number 8, in Hunslet's 22-44 defeat by St. Helens in the Championship Final during the 1958–59  season at Odsal Stadium, Bradford on Saturday 16 May 1959, in front of a crowd of 52,560.

Club career
Donald Hatfield was transferred from to Dewsbury Juniors  ARLFC to Halifax during 1946, he was placed on the transfer list, at his own request, at a fee of £2,500 during October 1950 (based on increases in average earnings, this would be approximately £216,900 in 2017), he was transferred from Halifax to Dewsbury on Wednesday 29 August 1951, he was transferred from Dewsbury to Hunslet, he made his début for Hunslet playing left-, i.e. number 8, against Hull Kingston Rovers at Old Craven Park, Kingston upon Hull on Saturday 24 October 1953, he played his last match for Hunslet during the 1961–62 season.

Hunslet career statistics

Genealogical information
Donald Hatfield was the son of Fred Moor(e) Hatfield (born 9 June 1900, birth registered second ¼ 1900 in Dewsbury district – death unknown) and Lily (née Goodall, born 31 October 1899 in Leeds district – died second ¼ 1970 (aged 70) in Upper Agbrigg district) married 4 November 1921, marriage registered during fourth ¼ 1921 in Dewsbury district. He was the younger brother of Norman Hatfield (birth registered second ¼ 1922 in Dewsbury district), and the older brother of Joyce Hatfield (birth registered third ¼ 1926 in Dewsbury district) and Marlene Hatfield (birth registered second ¼ 1938 in Dewsbury district – death registered second ¼ 1938 in Dewsbury district). Donald Hatfield's marriage to Mary (née Cameron, birth unknown – died ) was registered during second ¼ 1953 in Dewsbury district. They had children; Lynne Hatfield (birth registered third ¼ 1954 in Dewsbury district - January 2020 (aged 65)) and Russell Hatfield (birth registered first ¼  in Dewsbury district).

References

External links
Search for "Hatfield" at rugbyleagueproject.org
Archive 3 at hunsletrugbyleagueexparksideplayers
Search for "Donald Hatfield" at britishnewspaperarchive.co.uk
Search for "Don Hatfield" at britishnewspaperarchive.co.uk

1924 births
1981 deaths
Dewsbury Rams players
English rugby league players
Halifax R.L.F.C. players
Hunslet F.C. (1883) players
Rugby league players from Dewsbury
Rugby league props